Tyndall Stone is a registered trademark name by Gillis Quarries Ltd.  Tyndall Stone is a dolomitic limestone that is quarried from the Selkirk Member of the Ordovician Red River Formation in the vicinity of Garson and Tyndall, Manitoba, Canada. It is a cream-coloured limestone with a pervasive mottling of darker dolomite. The mottling gives the rock a tapestry-like effect, and it is popular for use as a building and ornamental stone.

Tyndall Stone is highly fossiliferous and the fossils contribute to its aesthetic appeal. It contains numerous fossil gastropods, brachiopods, cephalopods, trilobites, corals, stromatoporoids, and others. The mottling results from burrowing by marine creatures that occurred during and shortly after limestone deposition. The identity of the burrowing organisms is not known, but fossil burrows of this type have been given the name Thalassinoides.

Tyndall Stone was first used in 1832 for building Lower Fort Garry, and has since become popular for building purposes throughout Canada and the United States. The Canadian Parliament Buildings in Ottawa, Ontario, the Saskatchewan Legislative Building in Regina, Saskatchewan, the University of Saskatchewan in Saskatoon, Saskatchewan, the Federal Public Building in Edmonton, Alberta, the Canadian Museum of History in Gatineau, Quebec, the Manitoba Legislative Building in Winnipeg, Manitoba, the Banff Springs Hotel, the Empress Hotel in Victoria, British Columbia, les Apartements Le Chateau in Montreal, Quebec and many others include Tyndall Stone in their construction.

The Tyndall Stone quarry is operated by Gillis Quarries Ltd. and is located approximately 40 kilometres northeast of Winnipeg, Manitoba. The quarry has been in operation, and owned by the same family, since 1910.

In 2023, Tyndall Stone was designated as a Global Heritage Stone Resource, the only one of Canadian origin.

Cultural reference 
Author Carol Shields described Tyndall Stone in her Pulitzer Prize winning novel, The Stone Diaries.

References

External links 

 Tyndall Stone at Manitoba Industry, Economic Development and Mines 
 Tyndall Stone® at Geological Survey of Canada 
 Gillis Quarries, operator of Tyndall Stone® quarry 
 Manitoba's Tyndall Stone® by Mario Coniglio 
 GeoCache of Tyndall Stone® building with fossil descriptions 

Quarrying
Limestone
Dolomite (rock)
Building stone
Architecture in Canada
Stratigraphy of Manitoba
Geologic formations of Canada